A total solar eclipse will occur on August 15, 2091. A solar eclipse occurs when the Moon passes between Earth and the Sun, thereby totally or partly obscuring the image of the Sun for a viewer on Earth. A total solar eclipse occurs when the Moon's apparent diameter is larger than the Sun's, blocking all direct sunlight, turning day into darkness. Totality occurs in a narrow path across Earth's surface, with the partial solar eclipse visible over a surrounding region thousands of kilometres wide.

This will be the last of 42 umbral eclipses of Solar Saros 127. The 1st was in 1352 and the 42nd will be in 2091. The total duration is 739 years.

Related eclipses

Solar eclipses 2091–2094

Saros 127

Notes

References

2091 08 15
2091 in science
2091 08 15
2091 08 15